"Who Can Explain?" is a song written by Abner Silver and Roy Alfred and performed by Frankie Lymon and The Teenagers featuring Jimmy Wright and His Orchestra. It reached #7 on the US R&B chart in 1956. The song was featured on their 1956 album, The Teenagers Featuring Frankie Lymon.

The single's A-side, "I Promise to Remember", reached #10 on the US R&B chart and #57 on the Billboard pop chart.

References

1956 songs
1956 singles
Songs written by Abner Silver
The Teenagers songs
Gee Records singles
Songs with lyrics by Roy Alfred